Kingsford Smith can refer to:

Sydney Airport, the primary commercial airport serving Sydney, Australia
Charles Kingsford Smith (1897–1935), an early Australian aviation pioneer, after whom Sydney Airport is named
Division of Kingsford Smith, an Australian electoral division in the state of New South Wales
Kingsford Smith (moonlet), a natural satellite of Saturn